Richard B. Bennett (born June 25, 1957) is an American Republican politician. He is a member of the Mississippi House of Representatives from the 120th District, being first elected in 2007.

References

1957 births
Living people
People from Long Beach, Mississippi
Republican Party members of the Mississippi House of Representatives
21st-century American politicians